Hammasa Kohistani (born 19 December 1987) is a British model of Afghan descent. She became the first Muslim beauty contestant to be crowned Miss England in 2005. She was crowned at the age of 18, following a two-day competition at Liverpool's Olympia Theatre on 3 September 2005, and was chosen from 40 contestants.

Biography 
Kohistani was born in 1987 in Tashkent, Uzbekistan, when it was part of the USSR to Afghan parents who moved there as refugees. Kohistani is of the Afghan Tajik ethnic group. During the Soviet–Afghan War her parents fled to what was then the Uzbek SSR in the Soviet Union. She and her parents returned to Kabul, Afghanistan, but in 1996 they escaped from there when the Taliban took control of the city. They eventually made it to the United Kingdom and settled in Southall, in West London, where her father Kushal set up a fast food restaurant.

Kohistani studied in London and attended Lampton School in Hounslow and was a student at Uxbridge College.

Modelling career
Kohistani started as a teenage model and has mostly been a foot model for various shoe brands such as Sophia Webster and Kurt Geirger.

Kohistani won the Miss England 2005 competition as a brunette, dressed in an ivory white chiffon and silk ball gown. She later said "When they announced that I had won I thought I had misheard. I hoped they hadn't, but it took a second to sink in." She also said that she was "happy to make history," that "I'm making history and I'm very happy. Hopefully I won't be the last" and that she was looking forward to representing England in the Miss World championships. The Miss England competition included another Muslim, Sarah Mendly, who had been voted Miss Nottingham. Her entry had caused controversy, since contestants typically wear relatively little clothing, and was called upon to pull out of the contest by the Liverpool Islamic Institute.

Kohistani represented England in the Miss World championships in China in December 2005, but despite being one of the favourites, she failed to advance to the semifinal of 16.

She was known as "Miss Maya" after the Asian fashion house which sponsored her, and was reportedly offered a part in a forthcoming Bollywood movie.

Kohistani was featured in Teen Vogue magazine in May 2006.

Personal life and other ventures
Kohistani speaks six languages, including English, Russian and Persian.

After Prime Minister Tony Blair spoke to members of parliament on the anniversary of the 7 July 2005 London bombings, saying that Muslims needed to curb extremism, Kohistani criticised the government as stirring up animosity against Muslims.

One of Kohistani's portraits on stock photo site Getty Images was used as the basis for the face of the extraterrestrial character Tali'Zorah from the Mass Effect series of video games. The stock photo was later replaced in Mass Effect Legendary Edition with an original image of Tali shown with her face mask removed.

References

External links
 Hammasa Kohistani – official Miss World biography
 Hammasa Kohistani  – Miss England

1987 births
Living people
British female models
British Muslims
Miss England winners
Miss World 2005 delegates
Models from London
People from Southall
Afghan Tajik people
Uzbekistani emigrants to the United Kingdom
Uzbekistani people of Tajik descent
British people of Tajik descent
Afghan refugees
Muslim models